Ashlyn Petro Carlyle Kilowan (born 19 December 1982) is a South African former cricketer who played as a left-arm medium bowler. She appeared in one Test matcs, 32 One Day Internationals and 11 Twenty20 Internationals for South Africa between 2003 and 2009. She played domestic cricket for Boland and Western Province.

References

External links
 
 

1982 births
Living people
Cricketers from Paarl
South African women cricketers
South Africa women Test cricketers
South Africa women One Day International cricketers
South Africa women Twenty20 International cricketers
Boland women cricketers
Western Province women cricketers
20th-century South African women
21st-century South African women